is a 1974 Japanese jidaigeki film directed by Toshiya Fujita and starring Meiko Kaji. It is a sequel to the 1973 film Lady Snowblood, itself an adaptation of the manga series of the same name by Kazuo Koike and Kazuo Kamimura.

Plot
Yuki Kashima is surrounded by policemen on a beach. She fights and kills several of them but is overwhelmed. She is quickly tried and sentenced to death by hanging, but suddenly rescued by the mysterious Seishiro Kikui, head of Secret Police. Inside his headquarters, he propositions Yuki to spy on an "enemy of the State", the anarchist Ransui Tokunaga. Ransui is in possession of a critical document which Seishiro seems quite obsessed with, deeming it highly dangerous to the stability of the government. If Yuki can obtain and deliver the document to Seishiro, he will grant her immunity from her charges.

Yuki infiltrates Ransui's home posing as a maid, and sets about looking for the document. But the more she observes Ransui, the more she questions the path Seishiro has put her on. When Ransui confides in Yuki, knowing full well who she is, asking her to deliver the document to his brother Shusuke, Yuki will be forced to decide her allegiance.

Cast
 Meiko Kaji as Yuki Kashima, Lady Snowblood
 Juzo Itami as Ransui Tokunaga
 Kazuko Yoshiyuki as Aya Tokunaga
 Yoshio Harada as Shusuke Tokunaga
 Shin Kishida as Seishiro Kikui
 Toru Abe as Kendo Terauchi

Staff
 Cinematography - Tatsuo Suzuki
 Sword fight arranger - Kunishirō Hayashi

Production
Lady Snowblood: Love Song of Vengeance was greenlit after the moderate financial success of the first film. As screenwriter Norio Osada had approached the original film as a standalone adaptation, the second film freed him to write an original story not directly based on the manga. In later years, Osada deemed the script unsatisfactory, partly owing to different creative approaches between him, co-writer Kiyohide Ohara and director Toshiya Fujita; however, he felt that the script's shortcomings also enabled Fujita to make the film more in his own style, which he had not been able to do on the first film. The anarchist Ransui Tokunaga was based on Kōtoku Shūsui.

Release
Lady Snowblood: Love Song of Vengeance was released theatrically in Japan on 15 June 1974 where it was distributed by Toho.
The film was released on DVD in the United States by AnimEigo with English-language subtitles on March 24, 1998. The film was released on Blu-ray and DVD by the Criterion Collection along with its predecessor, Lady Snowblood (1973), as The Complete Lady Snowblood.

References

Sources

External links
 
 
 
The Complete Lady Snowblood: Flowers of Carnage an essay by Howard Hampton at the Criterion Collection

1974 films
Films directed by Toshiya Fujita
1970s Japanese-language films
1970s crime thriller films
Live-action films based on manga
Japanese sequel films
Samurai films
1970s Japanese films